The 2022 ACU British Motocross Championship season (known for sponsorship reasons as the Revo MXGB fuelled by Gulf Race Fuels) was the 70th British Motocross Championship season. 

Tommy Searle started the season as the reigning champion in the MX1 class and would go on to successfully defend his title, his fourth overall.  This would be Searle's last season with the Honda team led by former world champion David Thorpe. 

Similarly, Conrad Mewse successfully defending his MX2 crown from the previous season, winning his third national title overall. This title came after Mewse split with the Hitachi KTM fuelled by Milwaukee team two months before the start of the season. 2022 would be Mewse's last year in the MX2, with him moving up to MX1 in 2023.

Race calendar and results
The full calendar with both dates and venues was released on 3rd February.

MX1

MX2

Circuit locations

MX1

Participants

Riders Championship

{|
|

MX2

Participants

Riders Championship

{|
|

References 

2022 in motorcycle sport
2022 in British motorsport